"The Man in the Moon Stayed Up Too Late" is J. R. R. Tolkien's imagined original song behind the nursery rhyme "Hey Diddle Diddle (The Cat and the Fiddle)", invented by back formation. It was first published in Yorkshire Poetry magazine in 1923, and was reused in extended form in the 1954–55 The Lord of the Rings as a song sung by Frodo Baggins in the Prancing Pony inn. The extended version was republished in the 1962 collection The Adventures of Tom Bombadil. 

Scholars have noted that Tolkien liked to imitate medieval works, and that the light-hearted poem fits into a reworking by Tolkien of the "Man in the Moon" tradition. This tradition consisted of myths such as that of Phaethon who drove the Sun too close to the Earth, down through a medieval story of the unlucky man who was banished to the Moon, and ultimately to a short nursery rhyme. Tolkien similarly wrote a myth of the creation, with the Sun and Moon carried on ships across the sky; and a story of an Elf who hid on the ship of the Moon, so as to create a multi-layered effect within his writings similar to the real medieval tradition.

The song has been set to music and recorded by The Tolkien Ensemble. In the extended edition of Peter Jackson's 2012 film The Hobbit: An Unexpected Journey, the Dwarf Bofur sings it at Elrond's feast in Rivendell. A rewritten version is sung in Kevin Wallace and Saul Zaentz's 2006 musical theatre production of The Lord of the Rings.

Context

Tolkien 

J. R. R. Tolkien, known as the author of fantasy books on Middle-earth including the bestselling 1937 children's book The Hobbit and the 1954-55 fantasy novel The Lord of the Rings, was a professional philologist, specialising in the understanding of the words used in medieval manuscripts such as Beowulf. He was a professor of English Language at the University of Leeds, and then at the University of Oxford, where he taught at Pembroke College.

Tolkien wrote two Man in the Moon poems, both related to traditional verses. They are "The Man in the Moon Came Down Too Soon" and "The Man in the Moon Stayed Up Too Late", the latter according to Tolkien "derived ultimately from Gondor ... based on the traditions of Men". They are both included in the short collection of Tolkien's verse, The Adventures of Tom Bombadil, with the frame story of being poems enjoyed by hobbits.

Early in The Lord of the Rings, at The Prancing Pony inn at Bree, the protagonist Frodo Baggins jumps on a table and recites "a ridiculous song" supposedly invented by his cousin Bilbo. "Here it is in full", said Tolkien, alluding to the shortness of the nursery rhyme. "Only a few words of it are now, as a rule, remembered."

Nursery rhyme 

The original "Hey Diddle Diddle" nursery rhyme, on which Tolkien's song is based, may date back to the sixteenth century or earlier. Some sources suggest it may be a thousand or more years old: a cat playing a fiddle was a popular image in early medieval illuminated manuscripts.

Harley lyrics 

An unnamed Middle English poem in Harley Manuscript no. 2253 is known under the modern English name "The Man in the Moon". Tolkien was aware of the poem, and may have wanted to connect it in some way to his stories, though he does not use the Middle English poem's central theme, a thornbush. The poem begins:

Song 

The song is written in 13 stanzas. The first five introduce the characters of the Hey diddle diddle nursery rhyme, and add the Man in the Moon and an inn complete with its ostler and landlord. The last eight stanzas embellish the nursery rhyme; the poetry teachers Collette Drifte and Mike Jubb write that Tolkien use them to enliven the tale with "detail, character, and with fun in his mastery of the language".

Structure 

The rhythm is a "jaunty" pattern of iambic feet in the five-line stanzas, in the pattern of 4-3-4-4-3 feet in the lines. The rhyming scheme is UABBA. Tolkien makes use of many poetic devices in the poem, such as alliteration, anthropomorphism, assonance, and internal rhyme. Tolkien varies the metre slightly from the strict iambic in "They rolled the Man slowly up the hill". Literary techniques include personification and simile. The "merry old inn" is contrasted with the "grey hill", the cat's fiddle is appropriately "purring low", while the round Man in the Moon is twice described as rolling.

Story 

Tolkien chooses to set the song's story in the context of "a merry old inn" with fine beer to attract the Man in the Moon. The song introduces each element of the original nursery rhyme in turn: the Man in the Moon in the first stanza, the musical cat in the second, the little dog in the third, the hornéd cow in the fourth, and the silver dishes and spoons in the fifth. 

The story proper begins with the sixth stanza, with the Man in the Moon "drinking deep" and the cat wailing. Now is the moment for the dish and the spoon to dance "on the table", as the cow and the little dog start rushing about. Stanza seven sees the Man in the Moon drink another mug of ale, and fall asleep "beneath his chair". This is the cue for the ostler to tell his "tipsy cat" that the Man in the Moon needs to be woken up, and in the ninth stanza, the cat "on his fiddle played hey-diddle-diddle, a jig that would wake the dead" and the landlord tries without success to wake the dozing Man.

Abandoning the attempt, they instead roll the Man back "up the hill" into the Moon, followed by the dish who "ran up with a spoon". The cat plays faster and faster, and all the inn's guests barring the Man himself "bounded from their beds" and danced. Stanza twelve sees the cat's frenzied playing break the fiddle's strings, and "the little dog laughed to see such fun" while "the Saturday dish went off at a run / with the silver Sunday spoon", expanding upon the last of the original nursery rhyme's words. Finally, the Moon rolls "behind the hill" as the Sun rises, astonished to see everyone going back to bed.

Publication history 

The 1923 version was written long before either of Tolkien's hobbit novels, The Hobbit (1937) and The Lord of the Rings, were planned. This version was called "The Cat and the Fiddle: or A Nursery Rhyme Undone and its Scandalous Secret Unlocked".

The version of the song printed in The Lord of the Rings is slightly longer, at thirteen ballad-like five-line stanzas. Shippey writes that Tolkien was in effect "raiding his own larder" for suitable materials. This version was republished, with a new title, in The Adventures of Tom Bombadil.

Reception

An imagined prehistory of poetry 

The Tolkien scholar Tom Shippey notes that nobody would call "The Man in the Moon Stayed Up Too Late" a serious poem. All the same, he cites it and its mate, "The Man in the Moon Came Down Too Soon" (also from 1923, also subsequently included in The Adventures of Tom Bombadil), as typical examples of Tolkien's working strategy for reconstructing philological information about sources now lost. In this case, the question is what the history is behind the abbreviated version of this poem that survives as a well-known but nonsensical nursery rhyme. By imagining a text that might reasonably have left the surviving rhyme, one can deduce clues that might have left other artefacts in surviving literature. Shippey argues that many of the scenarios in Tolkien's more serious work are similar recreations (asterisk' poems" in Shippey's phrase), attempting to explain abstruse passages in surviving Old English and Old Norse texts. The seemingly frivolous nursery rhymes are taken to have

Steven M. Deyo, in Mythlore,  endorses Shippey's suggestion of an imagined prehistory of the nursery rhyme, where

Performance versus folklore transmission 

The Tolkien scholar Dimitra Fimi writes that Tolkien is clearly setting Frodo's song apart as a performance of a traditional work. She states that readers quickly appreciate that Frodo's performance of an entertaining but "ridiculous song", supposedly written by his cousin Bilbo, is evidently "a highly sophisticated and literary derivative of the 'real world' nursery rhyme 'The Cat and the Fiddle. This stands in sharp contrast with Sam Gamgee's recital of "The Stone Troll", at once amusing and "metrically intricate", which the other hobbits make clear is new. It is clear, writes Fimi, that Sam, despite his basic education, must have created it; it has "the rare quality of impromptu improvisation modelled upon traditional forms, a quality that many traditional folksingers display".

Multi-layered tradition 

The medievalist Thomas Honegger writes that Tolkien gives the theme of the Man in the Moon a "multi-layered treatment" that gives it a "complexity and depth" comparable with the actual folk tradition that reaches back some eight centuries, spanning the 14th-century Middle English "Man in the Moon" poem in the Harley Lyrics, which he quotes at length with a parallel translation. The "nonsensical nursery rhymes" about the Man in the Moon inspired Tolkien's two poems ("... Stayed Up Too Late" and "... Came Down Too Soon"). Honegger comments that Christopher Tolkien seems to have been uncomfortable, even embarrassed, by the "low" folklore aspect of his father's Man in the Moon poetry, though his father, far from feeling discomfort, was happy to hint at a long and varied tradition through his stories and poems. At the "high mythology" level, he writes, the Old Norse myth of Máni corresponds to Tolkien's creation myths with the ships which carry Sun and Moon (Tilion) across the heavens. At the level of story, the tale of an unlucky fellow banished to the moon roughly matches (Honegger writes) Tolkien's old elf Uole Kuvion who hid on the Ship of the Moon "and has been living there ever since".

Medieval borrowings 

John D. Rateliff notes that Tolkien stated that when he read a medieval work, he wanted to write a modern one in the same tradition. He constantly created these, whether pastiches and parodies like "Fastitocalon"; adaptations in medieval metres, like "The Lay of Aotrou and Itroun" or "asterisk texts" like his "The Cat & The Fiddle"; and finally "new wine in old bottles" such as "The Nameless Land" and Aelfwine's Annals. The works are extremely varied, but all are "suffused with medieval borrowings", making them, writes Rateliff, "most readers' portal into medieval literature". Not all found use in Middle-earth (as "The Cat & The Fiddle" eventually did), but they all helped Tolkien develop a medieval-style craft that enabled him to create his attractively authentic Middle-earth legendarium. Hyde writes that the poem was at first a humorous commentary on the plentiful "'nonsense' that had been written" about "The Cat and the Fiddle".

Settings

The Danish Tolkien Ensemble recorded the song on their 1997 CD of settings of songs from The Lord of the Rings, An Evening in Rivendell. It was set by Caspar Reiff and Peter Hall. 
Af Søren Aabyen, reviewing the album for the Danish Tolkien Association, praised the "playful hobbit-song". Steve Renard recorded his version online for Signum University, with sheet music.

Peter Jackson does not have Frodo sing the song in his film of The Fellowship of the Ring, but in the extended edition of the 2012 film The Hobbit: An Unexpected Journey, the Dwarf Bofur sings it at Elrond's feast in Rivendell. 

In Kevin Wallace and Saul Zaentz's 2006 musical theatre production of The Lord of the Rings, presented in Toronto and London, the hobbits Frodo, Merry, Pippin, Sam, and the Breelanders sing a version of the song as "The Cat and the Moon", cut down to 4-line stanzas with a different metre. Shaun McKenna's lyrics were set to music by A. R. Rahman as the fourth musical number, and performed by the Finnish band Värttinä.

Notes

References

Primary 
This list identifies each item's location in Tolkien's writings.

Secondary

Sources

Further reading 

 "Tolkien's Lore: The Songs of Middle-earth" by Diane Marchesani, Mythlore: Vol. 7 : No. 1, Article 1. (1980)

External links 

 Text of the poem

Middle-earth poetry
Fiction set on the Moon
Poems in The Lord of the Rings

fr:Les Aventures de Tom Bombadil#L'Homme dans la lune a veillé trop tard